Lithopoma caelatum, common name the carved star shell, is a species of sea snail, a marine gastropod mollusk in the family Turbinidae, the turban snails.

Distribution
This species occurs in the Gulf of Mexico, the Caribbean Sea and the Lesser Antilles; in the Atlantic Ocean off the Bahamas.

Description 
The maximum recorded shell length is 100 mm.

The solid, imperforate shell has a conic shape. Its color pattern is soiled white, more or less tinged with green and brown. The elevated spire has an acute apex. The 6-7 whorls are convex, with fine incremental striae and oblique radiating folds above. The periphery shows several prominent squamose or spinose lirae. The base of the shell is somewhat flattened, with close squamose lirae separated by deep interstices. The aperture is silvery within, transversely ovate, very oblique, its margins fluted. The columella is extended, oblique, and arcuate.

The operculum is oval, with a submarginal nucleus. The outside is convex, white or brown tinted, and coarsely granulose.

Habitat 
The minimum recorded depth for this species is 0 m; maximum recorded depth is 44 m.

References

 Gmelin, J. F. 1791. Systema naturae per regna tria naturae. Editio decima tertia. Systema Naturae, 13th ed., vol. 1(6) 3021–3910. Lipsiae
 Turgeon, D.D., et al. 1998. Common and scientific names of aquatic invertebrates of the United States and Canada. American Fisheries Society Special Publication 26-page(s): 59
 Williams, S.T. (2007). Origins and diversification of Indo-West Pacific marine fauna: evolutionary history and biogeography of turban shells (Gastropoda, Turbinidae). Biological Journal of the Linnean Society, 2007, 92, 573–592
 Rosenberg, G., F. Moretzsohn, and E. F. García. 2009. Gastropoda (Mollusca) of the Gulf of Mexico, Pp. 579–699 in Felder, D.L. and D.K. Camp (eds.), Gulf of Mexico–Origins, Waters, and Biota. Biodiversity. Texas A&M Press, College Station, Texas
 Alf A. & Kreipl K. (2011) The family Turbinidae. Subfamilies Turbininae Rafinesque, 1815 and Prisogasterinae Hickman & McLean, 1990. In: G.T. Poppe & K. Groh (eds), A Conchological Iconography. Hackenheim: Conchbooks. pp. 1–82, pls 104–245.

External links
 

caelatum
Gastropods described in 1791
Taxa named by Johann Friedrich Gmelin